Macarena Rocío D'Urso (born 16 December 1991) is an Argentine basketball player for CB Almeria and the Argentine national team.

She participated at the 2018 FIBA Women's Basketball World Cup.

References

External links

1991 births
Living people
Argentine expatriate basketball people in Spain
Argentine expatriate sportspeople in Brazil
Argentine women's basketball players
Basketball players at the 2019 Pan American Games
Basketball players from Buenos Aires
Point guards
Pan American Games competitors for Argentina